The Ways of Love is a 1950 anthology film.

The film features three segments, Jean Renoir's "A Day in the Country", Marcel Pagnol's "Jofroi", and Roberto Rossellini's "The Miracle".

L'Amore and The Ways of Love
One segment of The Ways of Love, "The Miracle", was originally featured in a 1948 film, L'Amore.
In 1950, "The Miracle" was removed from L'Amore for international distribution and placed in The Ways of Love.

References

External links

1950 films
1950 drama films
Marcel Pagnol
Roberto Rossellini